Caladenia mentiens, commonly known as lesser fingers, is a species of orchid endemic to south-eastern Australia which grows singly, or in small, loose groups. It has a single, sparsely hairy, erect, linear leaf and a single whitish or pinkish coloured flower with a darker back and a cream-coloured labellum.

Description 
The backs of the sepals and petals are a darker pink colour. The lateral sepals and petals are held close to horizontally. The sides of the labellum have a few short teeth near the tip and there are two short rows of yellow calli with red stalks in the centre of the labellum. Flowering occurs from October to November. The flowers are self-pollinating and only open for a short period, sometimes not at all.

Taxonomy and naming 
Caladenia mentiens was first described in 1998 by David Jones from a specimen collected in the Carr Villa Flora Reserve in Launceston and the description was published in Australian Orchid Research. The specific epithet (mentiens) is a Latin word meaning "counterfeiting" or "imitating", referring to the similarity of this species to C. minor and C. pusilla.

Distribution and habitat 
Lesser fingers occurs in New South Wales, Victoria, Tasmania and on King Island and Flinders Island. It grows in dense forests near the coast in Tasmania and in forest and heath in Victoria. It is poorly known throughout its range, is easily overlooked and may be widespread.

References 

mentiens
Orchids of New South Wales
Orchids of Tasmania
Orchids of Victoria (Australia)
Endemic orchids of Australia
Plants described in 1998
Taxa named by David L. Jones (botanist)